Poznań is a city on the River Warta in west-central Poland, within the Greater Poland region. The city is an important cultural and business centre, and one of Poland's most populous regions with many regional customs such as Saint John's Fair (Jarmark Świętojański), traditional Saint Martin's croissants and a local dialect. Among its most important heritage sites are the Renaissance Old Town, Town Hall and Gothic Cathedral.

Poznań is the fifth-largest and one of the oldest cities in Poland. As of 2021, the city's population is 529,410, while the Poznań metropolitan area (Metropolia Poznań) comprising Poznań County and several other communities is inhabited by over 1.1 million people. It is one of four historical capitals of medieval Poland and the ancient capital of the Greater Poland region, currently the administrative capital of the province called Greater Poland Voivodeship.

Poznań is a center of trade, sports, education, technology and tourism. It is an important academic site, with about 130,000 students and Adam Mickiewicz University, the third largest Polish university. The city serves as the seat of the oldest Polish diocese, now being one of the most populous Catholic archdioceses in the country. The city also hosts the Poznań International Fair – the biggest industrial fair in Poland and one of the largest fairs in Europe. The city's other renowned landmarks include the National Museum, Grand Theatre, Fara Church and the Imperial Castle.

Poznań is classified as a Gamma− global city by Globalization and World Cities Research Network. According to several rankings it is one of the most business-friendly cities in Poland. It also ranks highly in safety and healthcare quality. The city of Poznań has also, many times, won the prize awarded by "Superbrands" for a very high quality city brand. In 2012, the Poznań's Art and Business Center "Stary Browar" won a competition organised by National Geographic Traveler and was given the first prize as one of the seven "New Polish Wonders". Companies headquartered in the city include energy provider Enea and e-commerce company Allegro.

The official patron saints of Poznań are Saint Peter and Paul of Tarsus, the patrons of the cathedral. Martin of Tours – the patron of the main street Święty Marcin – is also regarded as one of the patron saints of the city.

Names

The name Poznań probably comes from a personal name Poznan, which was in turn derived from the Polish participle  – "one who is known/recognized", and would mean "Poznan's town". It is also possible that the name comes directly from the verb poznać, which means "to get to know" or "to recognize", so it may simply mean "known town".

The earliest surviving references to the city are found in the chronicles of Thietmar of Merseburg written between 1012 and 1018:  ("bishop of Poznań", in an entry for 970) and ab urbe Posnani ("from the city of Poznań", for 1005). The city's name appears in documents in the Latin nominative case as Posnania in 1236 and Poznania in 1247. The phrase in Poznan appears in 1146 and 1244.

The city's full official name is Stołeczne Miasto Poznań (The Capital City of Poznań), in reference to its role as a centre of political power in the early Polish state under the Piast dynasty. Poznań is known as Posen in German, and was officially called Haupt- und Residenzstadt Posen (Capital and Residence City of Poznań) between 20 August 1910 and 28 November 1918. The Latin names of the city are Posnania and Civitas Posnaniensis.

In Polish, the city's name has masculine grammatical gender.

History

Early Middle Ages
For centuries before the Christianization of Poland (an event that essentially is credited as the creation of the very first Polish state, the Duchy of Poland), Poznań was an important cultural and political centre of the Western Polans. It consisted of a fortified stronghold between the Warta and Cybina rivers on what is now Ostrów Tumski. Mieszko I, the first historically recorded ruler of the West Polans and of the early Polish state which they dominated, built one of his main stable headquarters in Poznań. Mieszko's baptism in AD 966, seen as a defining moment in the Christianization of the Polish state, may have taken place in Poznań.

11th to 16th centuries
Following the baptism, construction began of Poznań's cathedral, the first in Poland. Poznań was probably the main seat of the first missionary bishop sent to Poland, Bishop Jordan. The Congress of Gniezno in 1000 led to the country's first permanent archbishopric being established in Gniezno (which is generally regarded as Poland's capital in that period), although Poznań continued to have independent bishops of its own. Poznań's cathedral was the place of burial of the early Piast monarchs, among them Mieszko I, Boleslaus I, Mieszko II Lambert, Casimir I, and later of Przemysł I and Przemysł II.

The pagan reaction that followed Mieszko II's death (probably in Poznań) in 1034 left the region weak, and in 1038, Duke Bretislaus I of Bohemia sacked and destroyed both Poznań and Gniezno. Poland was reunited under Casimir I the Restorer in 1039, but the capital was moved to Kraków, which had been relatively unaffected by the troubles. In 1138, by the testament of Boleslaus III, Poland was divided into separate duchies under the late king's sons, and Poznań and its surroundings became the domain of Mieszko III the Old, the first of the Dukes of Greater Poland. This period of fragmentation lasted until 1320. Duchies frequently changed hands; control of Poznań, Gniezno and Kalisz sometimes lay with a single duke, but at other times these constituted separate duchies.

In about 1249, Duke Przemysł I began constructing what would become the Royal Castle on a hill on the left bank of the Warta. Then in 1253, Przemysł issued a charter to Thomas of Guben (Gubin) for the founding of a town under Magdeburg law, between the castle and the river. Thomas brought a large number of German settlers to aid in the building and settlement of the city – this is an example of the German eastern migration (Ostsiedlung) characteristic of that period. The city, which covered the area of today's Old Town neighbourhood, was surrounded by a defensive wall, integrated with the castle. The royal chancery and the university ensured a first flourishing of Polish literary culture in the city.

In reunited Poland, and later in the Polish–Lithuanian Commonwealth, Poznań was the seat of a voivodeship. The city's importance began to grow in the Jagiellonian period, due to its position on trading routes from Lithuania and Ruthenia to western Europe. It would become a major center for the fur trade by the late 16th century. Suburban settlements developed around the city walls, on the river islands, and on the right bank, with some (Ostrów Tumski, Śródka, Chwaliszewo, Ostrówek) obtaining their own town charters. However, the city's development was hampered by regular major fires and floods. On 2 May 1536 a fire destroyed 175 buildings, including the castle, the town hall, the monastery, and the suburban settlement called St. Martin. In 1519, the Lubrański Academy had been established in Poznań as an institution of higher education, but without the right to award degrees, which was reserved to Kraków's Jagiellonian University. However, the Jesuits' college, founded in the city in 1571 during the Counter-Reformation, had the right to award degrees from 1611 until 1773, when it was combined with the academy.

17th and 18th centuries

In the second half of the 17th century and most of the 18th, Poznań was severely affected by a series of wars, attendant military occupations, lootings and destruction – the Second and Third Northern Wars, the War of the Polish Succession, the Seven Years' War and the Bar Confederation rebellion. It was also hit by frequent outbreaks of plague, and by floods, particularly that of 1736, which destroyed most of the suburban buildings. The population of the conurbation declined from 20,000 around 1600 to 6,000 around 1730, and Bambergian and Dutch settlers (Bambrzy and Olędrzy) were brought in to rebuild the devastated suburbs. In 1778, a "Committee of Good Order" (Komisja Dobrego Porządku) was established in the city, which oversaw rebuilding efforts and reorganized the city's administration. However, in 1793, in the Second Partition of Poland, Poznań came under the control of the Kingdom of Prussia, becoming part of (and initially the seat of) the province of South Prussia.

19th century to World War I
The Prussian authorities expanded the city boundaries, making the walled city and its closest suburbs into a single administrative unit. Left-bank suburbs were incorporated in 1797, and Ostrów Tumski, Chwaliszewo, Śródka, Ostrówek and Łacina (St. Roch) in 1800. The old city walls were taken down in the early 19th century, and major development took place to the west of the old city, with many of the main streets of today's city center being laid out.

In the Greater Poland uprising of 1806, Polish soldiers and civilian volunteers assisted the efforts of Napoleon by driving out Prussian forces from the region. The city became a part of the Duchy of Warsaw in 1807, and was the seat of Poznań Department – a unit of administrative division and local government. However, in 1815, following the Congress of Vienna, the region was returned to Prussia, and Poznań became the capital of the semi-autonomous Grand Duchy of Posen. Around 1820, Poznań had over 20,000 inhabitants, 70% of whom were Poles, 20% Jews, and 10% Germans.

The city continued to expand, and various projects were funded by Polish philanthropists, such as the Raczyński Library and the Bazar hotel. The city's first railway, running north-west to Stargard, opened in 1848. Due to its strategic location, the Prussian authorities intended to make Poznań into a fortress city, building a ring of defensive fortifications around it. Work began on the citadel with Fort Winiary in 1828, and in subsequent years the entire set of defenses called Festung Posen was completed.

A Greater Poland Uprising during the Revolutions of 1848 was ultimately unsuccessful, and the Grand Duchy lost its remaining autonomy, Poznań becoming simply the capital of the Prussian Province of Posen. It would become part of the German Empire with the unification of German states in 1871. Polish patriots continued to form societies such as the Central Economic Society for the Grand Duchy of Poznań, and a Polish theatre opened in 1875. However, the authorities made efforts to Germanize the region, particularly through the Prussian Settlement Commission founded in 1886. Germans accounted for 38% of the city's population in 1867, though this percentage would later decline somewhat, particularly after the region returned to Poland.

Another expansion of Festung Posen was planned, with an outer ring of more widely spaced forts around the perimeter of the city. Building of the first nine forts began in 1876, and nine intermediate forts were built from 1887. The inner ring of fortifications was now considered obsolete and came to be mostly taken down by the early 20th century, although the citadel remained in use. This made space for further civilian construction, particularly the Imperial Castle (Zamek) which was completed in 1910, and other grand buildings around it, including today's central university buildings and the opera house. The city's boundaries were also significantly extended to take in former suburban villages: Piotrowo and Berdychowo in 1896, Łazarz, Górczyn, Jeżyce and Wilda in 1900, and Sołacz in 1907. 
In 1910, Poznań had 156,696 inhabitants, of which nearly 60% were Poles (over 91,000 Polish inhabitants of the city), and around 40% were Germans (over 65,000 German inhabitants of the city). Other nationalities accounted for 1-2% of the population (mainly Jews).

End of World War I to World War II

At the end of World War I, the final Greater Poland Uprising in 1918–1919 brought Poznań and most of the region back to newly reborn Poland, which was confirmed by the Treaty of Versailles. The local German populace had to acquire Polish citizenship or leave the country. This led to a wide emigration of the ethnic Germans of the town's population – the town's German population decreased from 65,321 in 1910 to 5,980 in 1926 and further to 4,387 in 1934. In the interwar Second Polish Republic, the city again became the capital of Poznań Voivodeship. Poznań's university, today called Adam Mickiewicz University, was founded in 1919, and in 1924 the Poznań International Fair began. In 1929, the fair site was the venue for a major National Exhibition (Powszechna Wystawa Krajowa, popularly PeWuKa) marking the tenth anniversary of independence; it attracted around 4.5 million visitors. In the 1930s, the fair ranked as Europe's fourth largest organiser of international trade events. The city's boundaries were again expanded in 1925 to include Główna, Komandoria, Rataje, Starołęka, Dębiec, Szeląg and Winogrady, and in 1933: Golęcin and Podolany.

During the German occupation of 1939–1945, Poznań was incorporated into the Nazi Germany as the capital of Reichsgau Wartheland. Many Polish inhabitants were executed, arrested, expelled to the General Government or used as forced labour; at the same time, many Germans and Volksdeutsche were settled in the city. The German population increased from around 5,000 in 1939 (some 2% of the inhabitants) to around 95,000 in 1944.

The Jewish community's history in the city dates back to the 13th century. In the past, the Jewish council in Poznan became one of the oldest and most important Jewish councils in Poland. The pre-war Jewish population of at least about 2,000 were mostly murdered in the Holocaust. A concentration camp was set up in Fort VII, one of the 19th-century perimeter forts. The camp was later moved to Żabikowo south of Poznań.

The Nazi authorities significantly expanded Poznań's boundaries to include most of the present-day area of the city; these boundaries were retained after the war. Poznań was captured by the Red Army, assisted by Polish volunteers, on 23 February 1945 following the Battle of Poznań, in which the German army conducted a last-ditch defense in line with Hitler's designation of the city as a Festung. The Citadel was the last point to be taken, and the fighting left much of the city, particularly the Old Town, in ruins. Many monuments were also destroyed, including Gutzon Borglum's statue of Woodrow Wilson in Poznan.

1945–present
Due to the expulsion and flight of German population Poznań's post-war population was almost uniformly Polish. The city again became a voivodeship capital. In 1950, the size of Poznań Voivodeship was reduced, and the city itself was given separate voivodeship status. This status was lost in the 1975 reforms, which also significantly reduced the size of Poznań Voivodeship.

The Poznań 1956 protests are seen as an early instance of discontent with communist rule. In June 1956, a protest by workers at the city's Cegielski locomotive factory developed into a series of strikes and popular protests against the policies of the government. After a protest march on 28 June was fired on, crowds attacked the communist party and secret police headquarters, where they were repulsed by gunfire. Riots continued for two days until being quelled by the army; 67 people were killed according to official figures. A monument to the victims was erected in 1981 at Plac Mickiewicza.

The post-war years had seen much reconstruction work on buildings damaged in the fighting. From the 1960s onwards intensive housing development took place, consisting mainly of pre-fabricated concrete blocks of flats, especially in Rataje and Winogrady, and later Piątkowo, following its incorporation into the city in 1974. Another infrastructural change, which was completed in 1968, was the rerouting of the river Warta to follow two straight branches either side of Ostrów Tumski.

The most recent expansion of the city's boundaries took place in 1987, with the addition of new areas mainly to the north, including Morasko, Radojewo and Kiekrz. The first free local elections following the fall of communism took place in 1990. With the Polish local government reforms of 1999, Poznań again became the capital of a larger province entitled Greater Poland Voivodeship. It also became the seat of a powiat Poznań County, with the city itself gaining separate powiat status.

Post-communism infrastructural developments include the opening of the Pestka Fast Tram route in 1997, and Poznań's first motorway connections in 2003 as Poland's east–west A2 highway runs south of the city centre, serving also as a bypass. In 2006 country's first F-16 Fighting Falcons came to be stationed at the 31st Air Base in Krzesiny in the south-east of the city.

Poznań continues to host regular trade fairs and international events, including the United Nations Climate Change Conference in 2008. It was one of the host cities for UEFA Euro 2012.

Geography

Poznań's main river is the Warta, which flows through the city from south to north. As it approaches the city centre it divides into two branches, flowing west and east of Ostrów Tumski Cathedral island, and meeting again further north. The smaller Cybina river flows through eastern Poznań to meet the east branch of the Warta, which is also called Cybina – its northern section was originally a continuation of that river, while its southern section has been artificially widened to form a main stream of the Warta. Other tributaries of the Warta within Poznań are the Junikowo Stream (Strumień Junikowski), which flows through southern Poznań from the west, meeting the Warta just outside the city boundary in Luboń; the Bogdanka and Wierzbak, formerly two separate tributaries flowing from the north-west and along the north side of the city centre, now with their lower sections diverted underground; the Główna, flowing through the neighbourhood of the same name in north-east Poznań; and the Rose Stream (Strumień Różany) flowing east from Morasko in the north of the city. The course of the Warta in central Poznań was formerly quite different from today: the main stream ran between Grobla and Chwaliszewo, which were originally both islands. The branch west of Grobla (the Zgniła Warta – "rotten Warta") was filled in late in the 19th century, and the former main stream west of Chwaliszewo was diverted and filled in during the 1960s. This was done partly to prevent floods, which did serious damage to Poznań frequently throughout history.

Poznań's largest lake is Kiekrz in the north-west end of the city. Other large lakes include Malta, an artificial lake formed in 1952 on the lower Cybina river, Strzeszyn on the Bogdanka, and Rusałka, an artificial lake formed in 1943 further down the Bogdanka river. The latter two are popular bathing places. Kiekrz lake is much used for sailing, while Malta is a competitive rowing and canoeing venue.

The city centre – including the Old Town, the former islands of Grobla and Chwaliszewo, the main street Święty Marcin and many other important buildings and districts – lies on the west side of the Warta. Opposite it between the two branches of the Warta is Ostrów Tumski, containing Cathedral and other ecclesiastical buildings, as well as housing and industrial facilities. Facing the cathedral on the east bank of the river is the historic district of Śródka. Large areas of apartment blocks, built from the 1960s onwards, include Rataje in the east, and Winogrady and Piątkowo north of the centre. Older residential and commercial districts include those of Wilda, Łazarz and Górczyn to the south, and Jeżyce to the west. There are also significant areas of forest within the city boundaries, particularly in the east adjoining Swarzędz, and around the lakes in the north-west.

For more details on Poznań's geography, see the articles on its five main districts: Stare Miasto, Nowe Miasto, Jeżyce, Grunwald, and Wilda.

Climate
The climate of Poznań is within the transition zone between a humid continental and oceanic climate (Köppen: Cfb to Dfb although it just fits in the second in the 0 °C isotherm) and with relatively cold winters and warm summers. Snow is common in winter, when night-time temperatures are typically below zero. In summer temperatures may often reach . The rainiest month is July, mainly due to short but intense cloudbursts and thunderstorms. The number of hours of sunshine are among the highest in the country. Climate in this area has mild differences between highs and lows, and there is adequate rainfall year-round. The Köppen Climate Classification subtype for this climate is "humid continental climate). The warmest temperature was recorded on 11 July 1959 at

Administrative division

Poznań is divided into 42 neighbourhoods called osiedle, each of which has its own elected council with certain decision-making and spending powers. The first uniform elections for these councils covering the whole area of the city were held on 20 March 2011.

For certain administrative purposes, the old division into five districts called dzielnica is used – although these ceased to be governmental units in 1990. These were:
 Stare Miasto (Old Town), population 161,200, area , covering the central and northern parts of the city
 Nowe Miasto (New Town), population 141,424, area , including all parts of the city on the east bank of the Warta
 Grunwald, population 125,500, area , covering the south-western parts of the city
 Jeżyce, population 81,300, area , covering the north-western parts of the city
 Wilda, population 62,290, area , in the southern part of the city

Many citizens of Poznań thanks to the strong economy of the city and high salaries started moving to suburbs of the Poznań County (powiat) in the 1990s. Although the number of inhabitants in Poznań itself was decreasing for the past two decades, the suburbs gained almost twice as many inhabitants. The Poznań metropolitan area Metropolia Poznań comprising Poznań County and several other communities is home to over 1 million inhabitants. The complex infrastructure, population density, number of companies and gross product per capita of Poznań suburbs may be only compared to Warsaw suburbs. Many parts of closer suburbs such as Tarnowo Podgorne, Komorniki, Suchy Las, and Dopiewo produce more in terms of GDP per capita than the city itself.

Economy

Poznań has been an important trade centre since the Middle Ages. Starting in the 19th century, local heavy industry began to grow. Several major factories were built, including the Hipolit Cegielski's steel mill and railway factory, popularly called Ceglorz.

Nowadays, Poznań is one of the major trade centres in Poland. It is regarded as the second most prosperous city in Poland after its capital Warsaw. The city of Poznań produced PLN 31.8 billion of Poland's gross domestic product in 2006.

Many Western European companies have established their Polish headquarters in Poznań or in nearby towns such as Tarnowo Podgórne and Swarzędz. Most foreign investors are German (36%) and Dutch companies (14%). The best known examples of corporation who have their headquarters in Poznań and the surrounding areas are that of Volkswagen, GlaxoSmithKline, Amazon, Bridgestone, Beiersdorf, Raben Group (near Kórnik) and Kuehne + Nagel (near Gądki). There are also several shared services centers, and IT branch offices. Investors are mostly from the food processing, furniture, automotive and transport and logistics industries. Foreign companies are primarily attracted by relatively low labour costs, good road and railway network, good vocational skills of workers, and relatively liberal employment laws.

Some of the best-known major corporations founded and still based in Poznań and the city's metropolitan area include Allegro – owner of the Poland's biggest e-commerce site, H. Cegielski-Poznań SA – a historic manufacturer, Solaris Bus & Coach – a modern bus and coach maker based in Bolechowo, and Enea S.A. – one of the country's biggest energy firms. Kompania Piwowarska based in Poznań produces some of Poland's best known beers, and includes not only the local Lech Brewery's products but also Tyskie from Tychy and Dojlidy Brewery from Białystok among many others.

In 2008, three Poznań students founded Netguru, a software development and digital consultancy company. It grew fast to employ about 600 people in 2019.

Stary Browar, the center of commerce and art opened in 2003, won several awards for its architecture. Other notable shopping centers include Posnania, the biggest commerce facility in Greater Poland, Galeria Malta, and the shops at the Hotel Bazar – a historical hotel and commercial center in the Old Town.

Transport

The main Poznań railway station is called Poznań Główny, and is located just southwest of the city centre. There are also the smaller East Poznań and Poznań Garbary stations northeast of the centre, and a number of other stations on the outskirts of the city. The main east–west A2 motorway runs south of the city centre connecting it with Berlin in the west and Łódż and Warsaw in the east, serving also as a centre bypass. Other main roads run in the direction of Warsaw, Bydgoszcz, Wągrowiec, Oborniki, Katowice, Wrocław, Buk and Berlin.

Poznań has one of the biggest airports in the west of Poland called Ławica Airport. In 2016 it handled approximately 1.71 million passengers.

Since the bend of the communist era in 1989, city investments into transportation have been mostly into public transport. While the number of cars since 1989 has at least doubled, municipal policy concentrated on improving public transport, which mostly consists of trams and both urban and suburban buses. New tram lines are planned and built, including Pestka Fast Tram sections, and the rolling stock is being replaced for modern low-floor vehicles such as trams Solaris Tramino / Combino and Moderus Gamma, and buses such as Solaris Urbino.

Paid parking zones in the city centre were established, and Park & Ride car parks have been built to encourage commuters to leave their car on the outskirts of the city and continue their journey by public transport, as well as to allow safe and legal parking outside the city centre. Limiting car access to the strict centre actually increased the level of ridership.

Culture and heritage

Poznań possesses many historic buildings and heritage sites, mostly concentrated around the Old Town and other parts of the city centre. Many of these lie on the tourist Royal-Imperial Route – a walk leading through the most important parts of the city showing its history, culture and identity. Parts of the city centre are listed as one of Poland's official national historic monuments, as designated 28 November 2008, along with other portions of the city's historic core. Its listing is maintained by the National Heritage Board of Poland.

Apart from traditional theatres with a long history such as Teatr Wielki, Teatr Polski, Teatr Nowy, and others like Teatr Animacji, Teatr Muzyczny and Polish Dance Theatre, Poznań is also home to a growing number of different kind of alternative theatre groups. It is believed that even up to 30 more or less known groups may work in the city, and thus, the city has recently become a new Polish off-theatre performance centre.

Classical music events include the Henryk Wieniawski Violin Competition which is held every 5 years, and classical music concerts by the Poznań Philharmonic orchestra held each month in the Hall of the Adam Mickiewicz University, considered to be one of the best in terms of acoustics in Poland. Especially popular are concerts by the Poznań Nightingales.

Every year on 11 November, city residents celebrate the Day of St. Martin. A procession of horses, with Saint Martin at its head, parades along Saint Martin Street (ulica Święty Marcin), in front of the Imperial Castle. The renowned St. Martin's Croissant, a regional product of Poznań, are widely sold during the festivities.

An important cultural event in Poznań is the annual Malta Festival, which takes place at many city venues, usually in late June and early July. It hosts mainly modern experimental off-theatre performances often taking place on squares and other public spaces. It also includes cinema, visual, music and dancing events. Poznań also stages the Ale Kino! International Young Audience Film Festival in December, and Off Cinema festival of independent films. Other festivals: Animator (animated film festival), Ethno Port festival of traditional world's ethnic music, Maski Theater Festival, Dance International Workshops by Polish Dance Theater, Made in Chicago (jazz festival), Festival of Ice Sculpture, Science and Art Festival, Tzadik (Jewish music festival), and Meditations Biennale (modern art).

Poznań has several museums as well as cinemas, including multiplexes and art-house institutions. The Rozbrat social centre, a squatted former factory in Jeżyce, serves as a home for independent and open-minded culture. It hosts frequent gigs, an anarchist library, vernissages, exhibitions, annual birthday festival in October, poetry evenings and graffiti festivals. The city centre has many clubs, pubs and coffee houses.

A popular venue is Malta, a park with an artificial lake situated in its centre. On one south bank of the lake there are ski and sleigh slopes of Malta Ski centre, and on the opposite bank a large complex of Termy Maltańskie swimming pools.

Poznań Zoological Garden has two facilities. The Old Zoo is one of the oldest in Poland, established in 1874 just west of the city centre. The large  New Zoo was opened to the public in 1974, becoming second largest in Poland in terms of area. It is located on a hilly forest area with six large ponds at the eastern city's wedge of greenery, beyond the Malta lake. There is a dedicated and adored by children Maltanka mini-railway, that starts the route near the Śródka roundabout.

Population

In 1600, approximately 20,000 inhabitants resided in the whole Poznań conurbation. By 1732 the population had dropped to 4,000 due to wars, floods and plague. Historically, its growth rate was high throughout the 19th and 20th centuries; in the year 1900 approximately 110,000 people were registered as residents and by 1939 there was already 274,155 people. The population of Poznań has declined steadily since 1990, when it reached a maximum of 590,101. This phenomenon, which also affected other European cities, is caused in part by the growth of satellite suburbs at the expense of the downtown region within the city proper. In 2020, Poznań had 532,048 registered inhabitants being the fifth most populous town in Poland, while the metropolitan area had a population of more than 1,200,000 people.

Contemporary Poznań has one of the highest concentration of foreigners in Poland alongside Warsaw and Wrocław; a significant majority are migrant workers from Ukraine; others came from Italy, Spain, Belarus, Russia and Serbia. No exact statistic exists on the number of temporary residents from abroad. Many are students studying at Poznań's schools and institutions of higher learning.

Education and science

Poznań is one of the four largest academic centres in Poland. The number of students in the city is about 140,000, which ranks it the third or fourth after Warsaw and Kraków and about equal to Wrocław in student population. Every one in four inhabitants of Poznań is a student. Since Poznań is smaller than Warsaw or Kraków still having a very large number of students it makes the city even more vibrant and dense academic hub than both former and current capital of Poland – Kraków and Warsaw respectively. Poznań with its almost 30 universities and colleges has the second richest educational offering in the country after Warsaw.

Public universities
The city has eight state-owned universities. Adam Mickiewicz University (AMU, UAM in Polish) is one of the most influential and biggest universities in Poland. Poznań University of Technology (PUT, PP in Polish) is one of the most influential and biggest technical universities in Poland.

 Adam Mickiewicz University
 Poznań University of Technology
 Poznań University of Economics and Business
 Poznań University of Medical Sciences
 University of Life Sciences in Poznań
 Poznań University School of Physical Education
 University of Fine Arts in Poznań
 Academy of Music in Poznań

Adam Mickiewicz University is one of the three best universities in Poland after University of Warsaw and University of Kraków. They all have a very high number of international student and scientist exchange, research grants and top publications.
In northern suburbs of Poznań a very large "Morasko Campus" has been built (Faculty of Biology, Physics, Mathematics, Chemistry, Political Sciences, Geography). The majority of faculties are already open, although a few more facilities will be constructed. The campus infrastructure belongs to the most impressive among Polish universities. Also, there are plans for "Uniwersytecki Park Historii Ziemii" (Earth History Park), one of the reason for the park construction is a "Morasko meteorite nature reserve" situated close by, it is one of the rare sites of Europe where a number of meteorites fell and some traces may be still seen.

Poznań University of Technology was ranked fifth among all universities in Poland, and third among Polish technical universities, in the 2018 international Scimago Institutions Ranking. In the 2019 Academic Ranking of World Universities, known also as the Shanghai Ranking, PUT was classified among the 500 best universities in the world in two disciplines, i.e. "Computer Science & Engineering" and "Mechanical Engineering". PUT was ranked third among all Polish universities in the 2019–20 Ministry of Science and Higher Education popularity ranking. Recent years have brought extensive development of university infrastructure at the "Warta campus", located on the right side of Warta river between Malta lake and Poznań city center. Location of this campus belongs to the most impressive among Polish universities.

Private universities

There is also a great number of smaller, mostly private-run colleges and institutions of higher education, including SWPS University of Social Sciences and Humanities, Collegium Da Vinci, and WSB University.

High schools
Poznań has numerous high schools, which have different programmes focusing on different subjects. Some of the most notable are:

 Adam Mickiewicz High School
 Karol Marcinkowski High School
 St. John Cantius High School
 St. Mary Magdalene High School

Research
 Polish Academy of Sciences, the branch in Poznań
 Poznań Society of Friends of Arts and Sciences
 Poznań Supercomputing and Networking Center
 Western Institute

Sports

There are several multi-sport clubs in Poznań. Warta Poznań was one of the most successful clubs in pre-World War II history, and Lech Poznań football team frequently plays in European cups. Lech plays at the Municipal Stadium, which hosted the 2012 European Championship group stages as well as the opening game and the final of the 2006 under-19 Euro Championship. Warta usually plays at the small Dębińska Road Stadium, a former training ground for Edmund Szyc Stadium, however, since the latter fell into disrepair in 1998 and was sold in 2001, it became the team's main ground. The club was planning to rebuild Szyc Stadium with historical 60,000-seat capacity. In 2019/2020 season, Warta played their I liga matches at the stadium in Grodzisk Wielkopolski, as Dębińska Road Stadium did not fulfill the requirements of the I liga's authorities.

The city's third professional football team of multi-sport Olimpia Poznań club ceased activity in 2004, and the club focused on other sports, achieving good results in judo and tennis. Olimpia is hosting the annual tennis Poznań Open tournament at its Olimpia Tennis Park. The club owns a large sports complex near Rusałka lake, and apart from the tennis facilities boasts a large city recreation areas: mountain biking facilities with a four-cross track, an athletics stadium with 3,000 capacity, and a football-speedway stadium with 20,000 capacity. The latter had fallen into vast disrepair until it was acquired by the City Council from the Police in 2013 and was renovated. The football-speedway stadium hosts speedway club PSŻ Poznań, rugby union side NKR Chaos, American football team the Armia Poznań, and football team Poznaniak Poznań.

It also held the ICF Canoe Sprint World Championships in 1990, 2001, and 2010.

Termy Maltańskie, big water sports and recreation complex featuring Olympic-size swimming pool, is located at the north bank of the lake. A 50-metre pool can be divided into two 25-metre pools. The other pool with a diving tower also fulfils all requirements necessary for organizing sports competitions.

At the south bank of the lake, Malta-Ski year-round skiing complex is situated, and is hosting minor sport competitions, equipped with a toboggan run and a minigolf course. There is also a roller rink with a roller skating club nearby.

Since 2000, the city has been the host of the Poznań Marathon, one of the largest such races in the country.

Poznań's indoor sporting arena is simply called Arena. Located west of city centre and built in 1974, it originally seated about 5,500 people and is used for many different indoor sports and cultural events such as volleyball and concerts, among others. The facility has since been modernized, including lowering the level of the ground floor to increase arena capacity to about 9,200. Poznań has experience as a host for international sporting events such as the 2009 EuroBasket.

The city has the largest motorsport race track in Poland, Tor Poznań, located at the west city's suburbs in Przeźmierowo.

Poznań is also considered to be the hotbed of Polish field hockey, with several top teams of Warta Poznań, Grunwald Poznań – multi-sport club which also has shooting, wrestling, handball and tennis sections, Pocztowiec Poznań, and AZS AWF Poznań – an academic club which also fields professional teams in women's volleyball and basketball. Other clubs include: Posnania Poznań – one of the best rugby union teams in the country, Polonia Poznań – formerly a multi-sport club achieving many successes in rugby with only a football section remaining, KKS Wiara Lecha – football club formed by the supporters of Lech Poznań, and Odlew Poznań – arguably the most famous amateur club in the country due to their extensive media coverage and humorous exploits. There are also numerous rhythmic gymnastics and synchronised swimming clubs, as well as numerous less notable amateur football teams.

The E11 European long distance path for hikers passes through Poznań.

Poznań bid for the 2014 Summer Youth Olympics but lost to Nanjing, with the Chinese city receiving 47 votes over Poznań's 42.

International relations

Twin towns – Sister cities
Poznań is twinned with:

  Assen, Drenthe, Netherlands, since 1992
  Brno, South Moravia, Czech Republic, since 1966
  Kharkiv, Sloboda Ukraine, Ukraine, since 1998
  Győr, Western Transdanubia, Hungary, since 2008
  Hannover, Lower Saxony, Germany, since 1979
  Nottinghamshire, England, United Kingdom, since 1994
  Jyväskylä, Finnish Lakeland, Central Finland, Finland, since 1979
  Kutaisi, Imereti, Georgia, since 2009
  Nablus, West Bank, Palestine, since 1997
  Pozuelo de Alarcón, Community of Madrid, Spain, since 1992
  Ra'anana, Central District, Sharon Plain, Israel, since 2010
  Rennes, Brittany, France, since 1998
  Shenzhen, Guangdong, China, since 1993
  Toledo, Ohio, United States, since 1991
  Bay City, Michigan, United States, since 1977

  São José dos Pinhais, Paraná, Brazil,

Notable people

 Anna Anderson (c. 1900–1984), pretender of Grand Duchess Anastasia of Russia
 Ryszard "Peja" Andrzejewski (born 1976), rapper
 Lothar von Arnauld de la Perière (1886–1941), German U-boat commander
 Isidor Ascheim (1891–1968), painter and printmaker
 Stanisław Barańczak (1946–2014), poet
 Hanna Banaszak (born 1957), singer, poet
 Herbert Baum (1912–1942) resistance fighter
 Zygmunt Bauman (1925–2017), sociologist
 Judah Loew ben Bezalel (1512 or 1526–1609), important Talmudic scholar, Jewish mystic, and philosopher
 Robert Buech (1870–1949), politician
 Heinrich Caro (1834–1910), chemist
 Hipolit Cegielski (1815–1868), businessman
 Dezydery Chłapowski (1788–1848), general
 August Cieszkowski (1814–1894), philosopher
 Antoni Czubiński (1928–2003), historian
 Leopold Damrosch (1832–1885), conductor
Kurt Demmler (1943–2009), songwriter; accused of sexual abuse he hanged himself in his jail cell
 Ludwig Dessoir, (1810–1874), actor
 Tomasz Dietl (born 1950), physicist
 Franciszek Dobrowolski (1830–1896), theater director
 Tytus Działyński (1796–1861), political activist
 Małgorzata Dydek (1974–2011), basketball player
 Akiva Eiger (1761–1837), Rabbi of Poznań (1815–1837)
 Ewaryst Estkowski (1820–1856), teacher
 Gerard Ettinger (1909–2002), designer and manufacturer of leather goods.
 Krystyna Feldman (1916–2007), actress
 Wojciech Fibak (born 1952), tennis player
 Gerhard Flesch (1909–1948), German Nazi Gestapo and SS officer executed for war crimes
 Fredrak Fraske (1872–1973), the last surviving United States veteran of the Indian Wars
 Johannes Gad (1842–1926), neurophysiologist
 Jean Gebser (1905–1973), human consciousness scientist
 Eduard Gerhard (1795–1867), archaeologist.
 Arkadiusz Głowacki (born 1979), footballer
 Friedrich Goltz (1834–1902), physiologist
 Konstanty Gorski (1859–1924), composer and violinist
 Kasper Goski (died 1576), Mayor of Poznań, astrologer and medical doctor
 Heinrich Graetz (1817–1891) historian, wrote a history of the Jewish people from a Jewish perspective.
 Paul von Hindenburg (1847–1934), Field Marshal and President of the Weimar Republic
 Joanna Hoffmann-Dietrich (born 1968), artist and academic
 Piotr Hofmański (born 1956), jurist and current International Criminal Court President 
 Samuel Holdheim (1806–1860), a German rabbi and author.
 Maksymilian Jackowski (1815–1905), activist
 Anna Jantar (1950–1980), a popular Polish singer, who perished in a plane crash.
 Alfred Jodl (1890–1946), German WW2 military commander executed for war crimes
 John Jonston (1603–1675), naturalist and physician
 Jan A.P. Kaczmarek (born 1954), composer
 Maria and Bogdan Kalinowski, (1945–2020) & (1939–2017) filmgoing couple
 Richard Kandt (1867–1918), doctor and explorer
 Ernst Hartwig Kantorowicz (1895–1963), historian
 Marek Karpinski, computer scientist
 Günther von Kluge (1882–1944), Field Marshal
 Krzysztof Komeda (1931–1969), jazz musician
 Leo Königsberger (1837–1921), mathematician
 Kazimierz Kordylewski (1903-1981), Polish astronomer, claimed discovery of Kordylewski Clouds
 Antoni Kraszewski (1797–1870), politician
 Germaine Krull (1897–1985), photographer
 Jakub Kucner (born 1988), male model
 Gerard Labuda (born 1916), historian
 Arthur Liebehenschel (1901–1948), Nazi commandant of Auschwitz and Majdanek executed for war crimes
 Jarosław Leitgeber (1848–1933), purveyor of Polish books under partitions
 Paul Leonhardt (1877–1934), chess master
 Karol Libelt (1807–1875), philosopher
 Magda Linette (born 1992), tennis player
 Erich Ludendorff (1865–1937), general and politician
 Karol Marcinkowski (1800–1848), physician and social activist
 Władysław Markiewicz (born 1920), sociologist
 Teofil Matecki (1810–1886), philosopher
 Heinrich Mendelssohn (1881–1959), building tycoon
 Karl-Friedrich Merten (1905–1993), U-boat commander
 Małgorzata Musierowicz (born 1945), novelist
 Andrzej Niegolewski (1787–1857), colonel
 Władysław Niegolewski (1814–1880), politician
 Grzegorz Nowak (born 1951), conductor
 Władysław Oleszczyński (1809–1866), sculptor
 Catherine Opalińska (1680–1747), Queen consort of Poland, Grand Duchess consort of Lithuania
 Lilli Palmer (1914–1986), actress
 Janusz Pałubicki (born 1948), politician
 Kazimierz Piwarski, (1903–1968), historian
 Gustaw Potworowski, (1800–1860), activist
 Ignacy Posadzy, (1898–1984), priest
 Edward Raczyński (1786–1845), politician
 Cyryl Ratajski (1875–1942), mayor of Poznań
 Antoni Radziwiłł (1775–1833), aristocrat
 Marian Rejewski (1905–1980), cryptoanalist, Enigma codemachine codebreaker
 Richard Rothe (1799–1867), Lutheran theologian.
 Marcin Rożek (1885–1944), sculptor and painter
 Jerzy Różycki (1909–1942), cryptoanalist, Enigma codemachine codebreaker
 Dame Elisabeth Schwarzkopf (1915–2006), operatic and concert lyric soprano, born in Jarocin
 Michał Sczaniecki (1910–1977), historian
 Urszula Sipinska (born 1947), singer-songwriter, pianist and architect
 Bohdan Smoleń (born 1947), comedian and actor
 Józef Struś (1510–1568), scientist and mayor of Poznań
 Sir Paweł Edmund Strzelecki (1797–1873), Polish explorer and geologist
 Anna Suszczynska (1877-1931), composer
 Rafał Szukała (born 1971), butterfly swimmer
 Jan Szymański (born 1989), speed skater and Olympic medalist
 Mirosław Szymkowiak (born 1976) football player
 Jerzy Topolski (1928–1998), historian
 Lech Trzeciakowski (1931–2017), historian
 Jorge Veytia (born 1981), jurist
 Hubert Wagner (1941–2002), volleyball player and head coach of Poland men's national volleyball team
 Jan Węglarz (born 1947), computer scientist
 Leon Wegner (1824–1873), economist
 Roman Wilhelmi (1936–1991), actor
 Ray Wilson (born 1968), former vocalist of Genesis
 Tommy Wiseau (born 1955), director, screenwriter, and actor, known for cult film The Room, speculated to be born here
 Zygmunt Wojciechowski, (1900–1955), historian and founder of the Western Institute
 Anna Wolff-Powęska (born 1941), historian
 Barbara Maria Zakrzewska-Nikiporczyk (born 1946), composer
 Maciej Zaremba (born 1951), a Swedish journalist
 Szymon Ziółkowski (born 1976), hammer thrower, Olympic champion
 Henryk Zygalski (1906–1978), cryptoanalist, Enigma codemachine codebreaker

See also

 Tourism in Poland
 History of Poland
 Royal coronations in Poland including in Poznań cathedral
 Poznań Fortress
 The Poznań
 15th Poznań Uhlans Regiment

Notes

References

Bibliography

 Frieder Monzer: Posen, Thorn, Bromberg (mit Großpolen, Kujawien und Südostpommern), Trescher Reiseführer, Berlin 2011
 Gotthold Rhode: Geschichte der Stadt Posen, Neuendettelsau 1953
 Collective work, Poznań. Dzieje, ludzie kultura, Poznań 1953
 Robert Alvis, Religion and the Rise of Nationalism: A Profile of an East-Central European City, Syracuse University Press, Syracuse 2005
 K. Malinowski (red.), Dziesięć wieków Poznania (in three volumes), Poznań 1956
 Collective work, Poznań, Poznań 1958
 Collective work, Poznań. Zarys historii, Poznań 1963
 Cz. Łuczak, Życie społeczno-gospodarcze w Poznaniu 1815–1918, Poznań 1965
 J. Topolski (red.), Poznań. Zarys dziejów, Poznań 1973
 Zygmunt Boras, Książęta Piastowscy Wielkopolski, Wydawnictwo Poznańskie, Poznań 1983
 Jerzy Topolski (red.), Dzieje Poznania, Wydawnictwo PWN, Warszawa, Poznań 1988
 Alfred Kaniecki, Dzieje miasta wodą pisane, Wydawnictwo Aquarius, Poznań 1993
 Witold Maisel (red.), Przywileje miasta Poznania XIII-XVIII wieku. Privilegia civitatis Posnaniensis saeculorum XIII-XVIII. Władze Miasta Poznania, Poznańskie Towarzystwo Przyjaciół Nauk, Wydawnictwa Żródłowe Komisji Historycznej, Tom XXIV, Wydawnictwo PTPN, Poznań 1994
 Wojciech Stankowski, Wielkopolska, Wydawnictwo WSiP, Warszawa 1999

External links

 
 Official website of the City

 
Cities and towns in Greater Poland Voivodeship
City counties of Poland
Former capitals of Poland
Populated places established in the 8th century
Poznań Voivodeship (1921–1939)
Magdeburg rights
8th-century establishments in Europe
Holocaust locations in Poland
Nazi war crimes in Poland